Chondrostoma scodrense was a ray-finned fish that is classified as extinct by the IUCN Red List of Threatened Species.

The species was described from nine specimens caught 100 years ago. Its habitat in the late 19th century included Lake Skadar and its surroundings in Montenegro and Albania. Since then, in spite of intensive investigations of its only known previous range, in the 1980s, 1990s and 2003, no specimens have been recorded.

References

 

Chondrostoma
Extinct animals of Europe
Fish extinctions since 1500
Fish described in 1987